The Director's Cut Awards is an annual awards ceremony for excellence in film in South Korea. It is presented by the Korea Film Director's Network (KFDN), a group of approximately 300 Korean filmmakers. The KFDN selects winners in the Korean film industry in eight categories: Director, Actor (Male/Female), New Director, New Actor (Male/Female), Producer and Independent Film Director. It was launched in 1998 by film director Lee Hyun-seung with a membership of "young generation" directors in their twenties to forties.

The ceremony was temporarily discontinued after 2010 due to "internal issues" within the organization. It was resumed in 2014 and held concurrently with the Jecheon International Music and Film Festival (JIMFF).

Award ceremonies

2023
The 21st edition of award ceremony was held on February 24, 2023, at the Convention Hall on the 1st floor of the Chungmu Art Center. Maytree, a cappella group performed a special congratulatory performance during the ceremony.

2022
The 20th edition of award ceremony was held online on February 24, 2022. It was aired live on Naver TV.

Categories
Film

Best Director
Best Screenplay
Vision Award of the Year
Best New Director
Best Actor
Best Actress
Best New Actor
Best New Actress
 International Film Director of the Year (from 2022)

Series

Best Director
Best Screenplay
Best Actor
Best Actress
Best New Actor
Best New Actress

Film

Best Director

Best Screenplay

Best Actor

Best Actress

Best New Director

Best New Actor

Best New Actress

International Film Director of the Year

Best Producer

Best Independent Film Director

Series

Best Director

Best Actor

Best Actress

Best New Actor

Best New Actress

Best Screenplay

Special awards

References

External links 
 Director's Cut Awards at Naver 
 Director's Cut Awards at Daum 

South Korean film awards
Awards established in 1998
Annual events in South Korea